Nizhniye Garevskiye is a rural locality (a village) in Vereshchaginsky District, Perm Krai, Russia. The population was 16 as of 2010.

Geography 
Nizhniye Garevskiye is located 32 km southwest of Vereshchagino (the district's administrative centre) by road. Volegovo is the nearest rural locality.

References 

Rural localities in Vereshchaginsky District